Sebastian Reinhard Klaas (born 30 June 1998) is a German professional footballer who plays as a midfielder for  club SC Paderborn.

Club career
On 12 May 2022, Klaas signed with SC Paderborn.

References

1998 births
Living people
People from Ibbenbüren
Sportspeople from Münster (region)
German footballers
Association football midfielders
Germany youth international footballers
VfL Osnabrück players
SC Paderborn 07 players
3. Liga players
Regionalliga players
2. Bundesliga players
Footballers from North Rhine-Westphalia